Tevfikiye is a village in the Çanakkale District of Çanakkale Province in Turkey. Its population is 425 (2021). It lies next to the ruins of Troy.

References

Villages in Çanakkale District